Return of the Sentimental Swordsman, also known as The Flying Blade, is a 1981 Hong Kong wuxia film written and directed by Chor Yuen and produced by the Shaw Brothers Studio, based on Gu Long's Xiaoli Feidao series of novels. It stars Ti Lung, Alexander Fu Sheng and Derek Yee.

It is the sequel to The Sentimental Swordsman (1977). It was one of Shaw Brothers' highest-grossing films in the studio's history, surpassing the original at the box office. An in-name-only "sequel", Perils of the Sentimental Swordsman, was released in 1982, with no relation to the main character of Little Flying Dagger Li, instead being based in the Lu Xiaofeng novel series (also by Gu Long), and its previous film adaptations.

Synopsis 
Li "Little Flying Dagger" Xunhuan comes back to his home after three years of wandering. He has decided to have a normal life, but a group of skilled fighters and leaders are bent on killing him, so they can be ranked top by Bai Xiaosheng in his renowned list of the best warriors in the martial arts world. Li Xunhuan battles them as he searches for his estranged friend A'fei, who is now married and living in seclusion. Li asks A'fei to join forces and fight against a new threat that wants to rule the world: the Money Clan.

Cast 

 Ti Lung as Li Xunhuan
 Alexander Fu Sheng as Jing Wuming
 Derek Yee as A'fei
 Ching Li as Lin Shiyin
 Lo Lieh as Hu Bugui
 Ku Feng as Shangguan Jinhong
 Choh Seung-wan as Lin Xian'er
 Ku Kuan-chung as Shangguan Fei
 Kara Hui as Sun Xiaohong
 Tony Liu as Lu Fengxian (White Gown)
 Helen Poon as Xian'er's maid
 Yueh Hua as Guo Songyang
 Cheng Miu as Bai Xiaosheng
 Yuen Wah as Ximen Rou (Green Faced Spear)
 Yuen Bun as Zhu Ge (One Legged Iron Stick)
 Shum Lo as boss at eatery
 Lau Wai-ling as prostitute
 Wong Ching-ho as restaurant boss
 Wong Pau-gei as Money Clan member
 Wong Chi-ming as martial artist
 Tam Bo as Money Clan member / martial artist
 Cheung Chok-chow as restaurant patron
 To Wing-leung as restaurant patron
 Kong Chuen as Money Clan member
 Lee Hang as Money Clan member
 Fong Yue as restaurant patron
 Siu Tak-foo as Money Clan member
 Cheung Bing-chan as Money Clan member
 Ma Hon-yuen as martial artist
 Lam Wai as Money Clan member
 Lee Wan-miu as Jinhong's guest
 Siao Yuk as Xian'er's hired assassin
 Jue Gong as Money Clan member
 Ling Chi-hung as Money Clan member
 Gam Tin-chue as Jinhong's guest
 Cheung Chi-ping as Money Clan member / martial artist
 Chan Siu-gai as martial artist
 Fung Ming as Jinhong's guest / eatery waiter
 Lo Wai

External links 
 
 

1981 films
1981 martial arts films
Hong Kong action films
Hong Kong martial arts films
1981 action films
Shaw Brothers Studio films
Wuxia films
1980s Mandarin-language films
Works based on Xiaoli Feidao (novel series)
Films based on works by Gu Long
Films directed by Chor Yuen
1980s Hong Kong films